In cryptography, MD5CRK was a volunteer computing effort (similar to distributed.net) launched by Jean-Luc Cooke and his company, CertainKey Cryptosystems, to demonstrate that the MD5 message digest algorithm is insecure by finding a collision two messages that produce the same MD5 hash. The project went live on March 1, 2004. The project ended on August 24, 2004 after researchers independently demonstrated a technique for generating collisions in MD5 using analytical methods by Xiaoyun Wang, Feng, Xuejia Lai, and Yu. CertainKey awarded a 10,000 Canadian Dollar prize to Wang, Feng, Lai and Yu for their discovery.

A technique called Floyd's cycle-finding algorithm was used to try to find a collision for MD5. The algorithm can be described by analogy with a random walk. Using the principle that any function with a finite number of possible outputs placed in a feedback loop will cycle, one can use a relatively small amount of memory to store outputs with particular structures and use them as "markers" to better detect when a marker has been "passed" before.  These markers are called distinguished points, the point where two inputs produce the same output is called a collision point.  MD5CRK considered any point whose first 32 bits were zeroes to be a distinguished point.

Complexity
The expected time to find a collision is not equal to  where  is the number of bits in the digest output.  It is in fact , where  is the number of function outputs collected.

For this project, the probability of success after  MD5 computations can be approximated by: .

The expected number of computations required to produce a collision in the 128-bit MD5 message digest function is thus: 

To give some perspective to this, using Virginia Tech's System X with a maximum performance of 12.25 Teraflops, it would take approximately  seconds or about 3 weeks.  Or for commodity processors at 2 gigaflops it would take 6,000 machines approximately the same amount of time.

See also
 List of volunteer computing projects
 Brute force attack

References

Further reading
 

Cryptographic attacks
Volunteer computing projects